Galewood is a station on Metra's Milwaukee District West Line in the Galewood neighborhood of Chicago, Illinois. In Metra's zone-based fare system, Galewood is in zone B. As of 2018, Galewood is the 157th busiest of Metra's 236 non-downtown stations, with an average of 246 weekday boardings.

As of December 12, 2022, Galewood is served by 40 trains (20 in each direction) on weekdays, by all 24 trains (12 in each direction) on Saturdays, and by all 18 trains (nine in each direction) on Sundays and holidays.

 Galewood is located at grade level and consists of two side platforms which serve the outer two tracks. A third center track also runs through the station, to accommodate express trains. The tracks also carry Metra's North Central Service trains, though they do not stop at Galewood. A waiting room is available on the inbound side of Galewood station, but there is no ticket agent. This room has ample seating and is heated in the winter. An open shelter is on the outbound side of the station. Parking lots are located adjacent to and across the street from the station. Self storage businesses are located to the south of the station. A freight yard is located immediately east of the station. The land where the station now rests upon used to be where trackside utility poles were until circa 2000s when they were removed to construct the station, it was formerly located east of Narragansett Avenue.

Bus connections
CTA

 86 Narragansett/Ridgeland

References

External links 

Galewood Station Images (Chicago Railfan.net)
Station from Narragansett Avenue from Google Maps Street View

Metra stations in Chicago
Former Chicago, Milwaukee, St. Paul and Pacific Railroad stations
Railway stations in the United States opened in 1910